Wayne Arthurs and Andrew Kratzmann were the defending champions, but competed this year with different partners.

Arthurs teamed up with Sandon Stolle and lost in the final 6–7(4–7), 6–4, 6–3 to tournament winners Todd Woodbridge and Mark Woodforde.

Kratzmann teamed up with Wayne Black and lost in first round to Tomás Carbonell and Donald Johnson.

Seeds

Draw

Finals

Top half

Bottom half

References
 Official Results Archive (ATP)
 Official Results Archive (ITF)

Doubles